The Bear Creek Village Historic District is a national historic district located in Bear Creek Village, Luzerne County, Pennsylvania. The district includes fifty-five contributing buildings, four contributing sites and two contributing structures in the borough of Bear Creek Village.

It was added to the National Register of Historic Places in 1999.

History and features
Composed of fifty-five contributing buildings, four contributing sites and two contributing structures in the borough of Bear Creek Village, this historic district includes houses and workers' cottages, summer cottages, outbuildings, churches, cemeteries, a dam and lake, and the remains of 19th and early 20th century lumbering and ice industries. 

Notable contributing resources include the Bear Creek Dam, Albert Lewis Residence (1895, 1922-1923), The Pines (c. 1875), Grace Chapel (1884), the Lewis Family Cemetery, former St. Elizabeth's Catholic Church (1911), store and post office (c. 1885), Bear Creek Association clubhouse (c. 1920), and former Lehigh Valley Railroad Station (c. 1895).

This district was added to the National Register of Historic Places in 1999.

Gallery

References

Historic districts in Luzerne County, Pennsylvania
Historic districts on the National Register of Historic Places in Pennsylvania
National Register of Historic Places in Luzerne County, Pennsylvania